Les Mayons is a commune in the Var department in the Provence-Alpes-Côte d'Azur region in southeastern France.

It lies approximately 30 km from St Tropez and 10 km from Le Luc.

See also
Communes of the Var department

References

Communes of Var (department)